The Big Chill is a 1983 American comedy-drama film directed by Lawrence Kasdan, starring an ensemble cast consisting of Tom Berenger, Glenn Close, Jeff Goldblum, William Hurt, Kevin Kline, Mary Kay Place, Meg Tilly, and JoBeth Williams. The plot focuses on a group of baby boomers who attended the University of Michigan, reuniting after 15 years when their friend Alex dies by suicide. Kevin Costner was cast as Alex, but all scenes showing his face were cut. It was filmed in Beaufort, South Carolina.

The soundtrack features soul, R&B, and pop-rock music from the 1960s and 1970s, including tracks by Creedence Clearwater Revival, Aretha Franklin, Marvin Gaye, The Temptations, the Rolling Stones, and Three Dog Night. The music from the motion picture was composed and conducted by Bill Conti.

The Big Chill was adapted for television as the short-lived series Hometown. Later, it influenced the TV series thirtysomething and A Million Little Things.

Plot
After Alex Marshall commits suicide, his fellow University of Michigan alumni and close friends attend his funeral at the Tidalholm plantation in Beaufort, South Carolina. During the visit, everyone stays with Sarah and Harold Cooper.

The other friends; Sam Weber, a television actor; Meg Jones, once a public defender and now a real estate attorney; Michael Gold, a journalist for People magazine; former talk-radio psychologist Nick Carlton, an impotent Vietnam vet with a drug addiction; and Karen Bowen, an unfulfilled writer unhappily married to Richard, a conservative advertising executive. Also present is Chloe, Alex's younger girlfriend of four months.

While out jogging early the next morning, Harold, violating SEC rules, tells Nick that a large corporation is about to buy his small company, which will make him rich and triple the value of the stock. He told Alex, making it possible for him to buy property in the area. Harold suggests Nick use the tip to get into a new line of work. During their conversation, it is revealed that Sarah and Alex had a brief affair five years earlier, which all the friends knew about. Nick comforts Harold by saying she did not marry Alex. Harold, Sarah, and Alex moved past it, but Sarah tells Karen her friendship with Alex was harmed by the affair.

Richard goes home the next day, but Karen stays. Harold, Nick, Michael, and Chloe drive out to see the old house that Chloe and Alex were renovating. Meanwhile, Meg tells Sarah she is fed up with failed relationships and intends to have a child on her own. Believing she is ovulating, she plans to ask Sam to be the father of her child. (She approaches Nick first, thus becoming the last to know about his impotency.) Michael, who continually flirts with Chloe, needs investors for a New York nightclub. At dinner, Sarah becomes tearful and wonders if their fervent '60s idealism was "just fashion." Later that night, Meg approaches Sam, but he declines, feeling fatherhood is too great a responsibility as he already has an estranged child. Nick shares his drugs, with varying effects.

The next day, Harold buys running shoes for everyone. Nick goes to the old house and sits on the porch for hours, missing the Michigan football game. Michael offers to sire Meg's child, alluding to their one time encounter in college.

During a half-time game of touch football, a local police officer escorts a sullen Nick back to the house after he runs a red light and becomes belligerent. Recognizing Sam, the officer offers to drop charges if he will hop into Nick's Porsche 911 the way his J.T. Lancer character does on TV. Sam tries and fails, injuring himself slightly. Nick angers Harold by accusing him of being friendly with cops. Harold chastises Nick, reminding him that this is his home and Nick's recklessness could put his reputation in danger.

Karen tells a surprised Sam that she is in love with him and wants to leave Richard. He tells her his first marriage failed because of boredom and he does not want her to make the same mistake. Feeling led on, Karen angrily stomps off.

Meg tells Sarah that Michael is the wrong choice. Sarah observes the warm phone conversation between her young daughter and Meg. Later, the group, confused over Alex's death, regrets losing touch with him. To everyone but Sam, it seems that Alex withdrew deliberately. Nick is particularly cynical and bitter about life, love, and friendship. Karen follows Sam outside to mollify him, and they have sex. Sarah pulls Harold aside, embracing him, telling him she has a favor to ask: "It's about Meg..." Meg goes to him and they make love, tenderly. Chloe asks Nick to spend the night in the room she shared with Alex.

The next morning, Harold announces that Nick and Chloe will stay on to renovate the old house. Karen packs to return home to Richard. Michael ditches his nightclub plans. Nick shows everyone an old column that Michael wrote about Alex declining a prestigious fellowship. As the friends prepare to depart, Michael jokingly tells the Coopers they have taken a secret vote: They are never leaving.

Cast

Production
Lawrence Kasdan and Barbara Benedek began writing The Big Chill in September 1980 after seeing Return of the Secaucus 7. They wrote the screenplay as a semi-autobiographical story inspired by their optimistic political activism while attending university in the 1960s and then their disillusionment at society in the 1970s. While attending the University of Michigan, Kasdan lived at the Eugene V. Debs Cooperative House in the late 1960s, and his experiences at the co-op informed the direction of the screenplay. Many of the characters were based on his housemates, and the ways in which they cook communal meals and share their house echo the culture of Ann Arbor cooperatives. They wrote the screenplay while Kasdan was directing Body Heat, and many of the cast members from that film agreed to appear in The Big Chill if it was completed.

Kasdan first pitched the story to The Ladd Company but was rejected. Richard Fischoff unsuccessfully tried to convince Paramount Pictures to film the screenplay after reading it in the summer of 1982. When this failed he turned the screenplay to Marcia Nasatir, who had recently departed her executive positions at United Artists and Orion Pictures to cofound Carson Productions with Johnny Carson. Fischoff convinced Nasatir to finance the film as the studio's first production, and took over as supervising producer after she left the studio to work at 20th Century Fox.

Production on the film began on November 8, 1982, in Atlanta. Filming primarily took place at the Edgar Fripp House (called "Tidalholm") in downtown Beaufort, South Carolina, where the film was set.

Kasdan's wife Meg was placed in charge of compiling period-appropriate songs for the soundtrack. She heard "I Heard It Through the Grapevine" for the first time in many years while picking her son up at camp, listening to a Marvin Gaye cassette, and was struck by how the song with no dialogue would make a perfect start to the film.

It was decided before filming that "Ain't Too Proud to Beg" by The Temptations would be used for the cleanup after dinner scene, so the cast were given earbuds so that they could hear the song during filming, making it easier for them to keep the beat.

JoBeth Williams recalled filming a scene flashing back to the characters in 1968. "It was just wonderful to shoot", she said. "They rented this big house in Atlanta and installed bead curtains, rock posters, incense, 1968 Life magazines—it was a real time warp." Williams says that, in the scene, her character was living with William Hurt's character and ignoring Tom Berenger's. The Alex character, played by Kevin Costner "looking like a scruffy James Dean", was also in the scene. "That turned out to be the problem... Nobody could live up to that role after the build-up through the film, and audiences said they didn't want to see anybody try. So the last 10 minutes of the film were just cut out." Filming concluded on February 7, 1983.

Reception

Critical response
On Rotten Tomatoes, the film has an approval rating of 71% based on reviews from 41 critics, with an average rating of 6.2/10. The site's critical consensus reads "The Big Chill captures a generation's growing ennui with a terrific cast, a handful of perceptive insights, and one of the decade's best film soundtracks." On Metacritic, the film has a weighted average score of 61 out of 100 based on reviews from 12 critics, indicating "generally favorable reviews".

At the time, Richard Corliss of Time described The Big Chill as a "funny and ferociously smart movie", stating:

Vincent Canby of The New York Times wrote that the film was a "very accomplished, serious comedy" and an "unusually good choice to open this year's [New York Film Festival] in that it represents the best of mainstream American film making."

Roger Ebert of the Chicago Sun-Times gave the film two and a half stars out of four,  observing "The Big Chill is a splendid technical exercise. It has all the right moves. It knows all the right words. Its characters have all the right clothes, expressions, fears, lusts, and ambitions. But there's no payoff and it doesn't lead anywhere. I thought at first that was a weakness of the movie. There also is the possibility that it's the movie's message."

Accolades

In 2004, "Ain't Too Proud to Beg" finished #94 in AFI's 100 Years...100 Songs poll.

Soundtracks
Ten of the songs from the film were released on the soundtrack album; four additional songs not from the film were added to the original CD release as "additional classics from the era". The rest of the film's songs (aside from the Rolling Stones' "You Can't Always Get What You Want"), as well as the "additional classics" from the original soundtrack CD were released in 1984 on a second soundtrack album, titled More Songs from the Big Chill. Both albums were re-mastered in 1998; the track list of the first album mirrored the original LP, without the "additional classics". In 2004, Hip-O Records released a Deluxe edition, containing 16 of the 18 songs from the film (again excluding "You Can't Always Get What You Want" and newly omitting "Quicksilver Girl" by the Steve Miller Band) and three additional film instrumentals. A second "music of a generation" disc of 19 additional tracks was included as well. Some of those tracks had appeared on the More Songs release.

Original Motion Picture Soundtrack

Charts

Certifications

More Songs from the Big Chill

*Selections not in the motion picture The Big Chill.

Charts

See also

 List of American films of 1983
 Return of the Secaucus 7

References

External links

 
 
 
 The Big Chill: Surviving an essay by Harlan Jacobson at the Criterion Collection

1983 films
1983 comedy-drama films
American comedy-drama films
Carson Productions films
Class reunions in popular culture
Columbia Pictures films
1980s English-language films
Films about suicide
Films directed by Lawrence Kasdan
Films scored by Bill Conti
Films set in South Carolina
Films shot in South Carolina
Midlife crisis films
Films shot in Atlanta
1980s American films
Toronto International Film Festival People's Choice Award winners